Alcide Delmont, (2 October 1874-14 October 1959), was a French lawyer and politician from Martinique.

Biography 
With a doctorate in law, Alcide Delmont was admitted to the Paris Bar on 11 February 1904 as a lawyer. Secretary of the conference of the training course for lawyers at the Paris Court of Appeal in Pierre Massé's class (1906-1907), he had a dual career in politics and the judiciary for almost 50 years. He was also a member of the central committee of the Human Rights League (France).

From 1924 to 1936 he was a deputy for Martinique as a socialist republican and then as a left-wing independent.

He was Under-Secretary of State for the Colonies from 3 November 1929 to 17 February 1930 and from 2 March to 30 December 1930, in the first and second André Tardieu governments. Alcide Delmont was the second Martiniquan in history after Henri Lémery to be a member of a French cabinet.

References 

1874 births
1959 deaths
20th-century French politicians
19th-century French lawyers
Martiniquais lawyers
Martiniquais politicians
People from Saint-Pierre, Martinique